The Advanced Research Projects Agency for Health (ARPA-H) is an independent entity within the National Institutes of Health. Its mission is to "make pivotal investments in break-through technologies and broadly applicable platforms, capabilities, resources, and solutions that have the potential to transform important areas of medicine and health for the benefit of all patients and that cannot readily be accomplished through traditional research or commercial activity."

ARPA-H was approved by Congress with the passing of H.R.2471: Consolidated Appropriations Act, 2022 and was signed into Public Law 117-103 by U.S. president Joe Biden on March 15, 2022. 15 days later Health and Human Services Secretary Xavier Becerra announced that the agency will have access to the resources of the National Institutes of Health, but will answer to the HHS Secretary. The agency initially has a $1 billion budget to be used before FY2025 (Oct 2024) and the Biden Administration has requested much more funding from Congress. On September 13, 2022, Biden announced his intent to appoint Renee Wegrzyn as the agency's inaugural director, but it is still unknown where its headquarters will be located.

History  
The Defense Advanced Research Projects Agency (DARPA, formerly ARPA) has been the military's in-house innovator since 1958, a year after the USSR launched Sputnik. DARPA is widely known for creating ARPAnet, the predecessor of the internet, and has been instrumental in advancing hardened electronics, brain-computer interface technology, drones, and stealth technology. Inspired by the success of DARPA, in 2006 the Intelligence Advanced Research Projects Activity (IARPA) was created. This was followed by the Advanced Research Projects Agency–Energy (ARPA-E) in 2009. DARPA also inspired the Advanced Research and Invention Agency in the UK and recently the Biden administration has proposed ARPA-C for climate research.

The Suzanne Wright Foundation proposed "HARPA" in 2017 to focus on pancreatic cancer and other challenging diseases. IA white paper was published by former Obama White House staffers, Michael Stebbins and Geoffrey Ling through the Day One Project that proposed the creation of a new federal agency modeled on DARPA, but focused on health. That proposal was adopted by President Biden's campaign and was the model used for establishing ARPA-H. In June 2021 noted biologists Francis S. Collins (then head of the NIH), Tara Schwetz, Lawrence Tabak, and Eric Lander penned an article in Science supporting the idea. Dr. Collins became an important champion of the idea on Capitol Hill and the legislation garnered numerous sponsors in the 117th Congress.

In September 2022, Renee Wegrzyn was appointed as the agency's inaugural director.

Research  
A White House white paper identifies a number of potential directions for technological development that could occur under the direction of ARPA-H, including cancer vaccines, pandemic preparedness, and prevention technologies, less intrusive wearable blood glucose monitors, and patient-specific T-cell therapies. Additionally, the proposal suggests that ARPA-H focus on platforms to reduce health disparities in maternal morbidity and mortality and improve how medications provided are taken.

References

External links 
 Official website

National Institutes of Health
2022 establishments in the United States